The Ivory Coast national handball team is the national handball team of the Ivory Coast (Cote d'Ivoire). The team has made 16 appearances in the African Championship, but has yet to qualify for the World Handball Championship or Summer Olympics.  

In 1981, the Ivory Coast finished second at the African Championship, its best result to date. In 1992, the Ivory Coast hosted the African Championship, with the team finishing 5th.

African Championship record

Red border color indicates tournament was held on home soil; dark gray indicates the squad's best result.

References

External links
IHF profile

Men's national handball teams
handball
national team